Tate Cromwell "Piney" Page (January 6, 1908 – May 19, 1984) was an American college football player and coach. He served as the head football coach at Transylvania University in Lexington, Kentucky from 1938 to 1941 and at Central Missouri State College—now known as the University of Central Missouri—from 1948 to 1951, compiling a career college football coaching record of 23–43–5. Page was the head coach for Central Missouri State during the famous 1951 Central Missouri State vs. Southwestern football game in which a team rejected a touchdown awarded by the game officials. He was later dean of the College of Education at Western Kentucky University. Page graduated from Arkansas Tech University in 1930 and was a football letter-winner at Tulane University in 1933.

Head coaching record

References

External links
 

1908 births
1984 deaths
American football guards
American football tackles
Arkansas Tech Wonder Boys football players
Auburn Tigers football coaches
Central Missouri Mules football coaches
Transylvania Pioneers athletic directors
Transylvania Pioneers football coaches
Tulane Green Wave football coaches
Tulane Green Wave football players
People from Muskogee, Oklahoma
Coaches of American football from Oklahoma
Players of American football from Oklahoma